The Leigh Hall, originally  known as the Chemistry-Pharmacy Building, is an historic building on the campus of the University of Florida in Gainesville, Florida, in the United States. It was designed by Rudolph Weaver in the Collegiate Gothic style and was built in 1927. In 1949 the pharmacy college moved to new quarters and the building was renamed Leigh Hall for Townes  R. Leigh, longtime chairman of the chemistry department. A west wing was added in 1949 and the building was renovated in 1994.

Leigh Hall is a contributing property in the University of Florida Campus Historic District which was added to the National Register of Historic Places on April 20, 1989.

See also
University of Florida
Buildings at the University of Florida
Campus Historic District

References

External links
  UF Historic Sites Guide: Leigh Hall

Buildings at the University of Florida
National Register of Historic Places in Gainesville, Florida
Rudolph Weaver buildings
Historic district contributing properties in Florida
University and college buildings on the National Register of Historic Places in Florida
1927 establishments in Florida
University and college buildings completed in 1927